Sarah Shaheen (born 10 August 1983) is an Egyptian/Canadian former beauty pageant titleholder.

Education

She started her modelling career in 2001, while studying philosophy and art at the American University in Cairo. Her love for art led her to continue her studies in Montreal, Canada, this time choosing interior design. She obtained her master's in this field at the Florence Design Academy in 2009.

Career
Shaheen started her interior design career in El Gouna, working for Orascom Hotels & Development, on projects like La Maison Bleu and El Gouna Yacht Club.

In 2012, she went back to living in Cairo, where she was offered her first role in a feature film, Al Hafla, directed by Ahmed Alaa El Deeb, which was released in 2013.

She is also known for starring in El Ott, directed by Ibrahim El Batout, in 2014.

Shaheen's biggest break was in Hani Khalifa's Sukkar Mor (Bitter Sugar), for which she received positive reviews from film critics.

Personal life
Shaheen has been married to Amr Waked since 2015.

Films 
 2015: Sukkar Mor 
 2014: El Ott 
 2013: Al Hafla

References

External links
 

Miss Egypt winners
Miss Universe 2001 contestants
Egyptian female models
Place of birth missing (living people)
Living people
1983 births